R v Rahey, [1987] 1 S.C.R. 588 is a leading constitutional decision of the Supreme Court of Canada. The accused challenged a  delay of over eleven months on an application for a directed verdict as violation of the right to a trial within a reasonable time under section 11(b) of the Charter. The Court found that there was a violation of section 11(b) and  granted a stay of proceedings.

Background
Carl Rahey was charged with filing false tax returns and tax evasion. His assets were put in receivership. His trial began and after the closing of the Crown's argument, in December 1982 the defence applied for a directed verdict. Over a period of nine months the judge delayed issuing a decision. In September 1983, the defence applied to dismiss the charges as a violation of Rahey's right to trial in a reasonable time under section 11(b) of the Charter. The next day the trial judge issued his decision rejecting the application for a directed verdict. 

The application for dismissal was granted. On appeal the charges were reinstated.

There were three issues put to the Supreme Court:
whether the Supreme Court of Nova Scotia was a court of competent jurisdiction for the purposes of an application under s. 24(1) of the Charter; 
 whether appellant's right to be tried under a reasonable time was infringed; and, if so, 
 whether the superior court judge properly exercised her jurisdiction in dismissing the charges because of the unreasonable delay of the trial judge.

Judgment of the Supreme Court
The majority allowed the appeal and issued a stay of proceedings. There were four separate reasons written.

See also
 List of Supreme Court of Canada cases

External links
 
 LLC in any state of the U.S
 

Canadian Charter of Rights and Freedoms case law
Supreme Court of Canada cases
1987 in Canadian case law
Canadian criminal procedure case law